The 2021 Biella Challenger VI was a professional tennis tournament played on outdoor red clay courts. It was part of the 2021 ATP Challenger Tour. It took in Biella, Italy between 17 and 23 May 2021.

Singles main-draw entrants

Seeds

 Rankings are as of 10 May 2021.

Other entrants
The following players received wildcards into the singles main draw:
  Flavio Cobolli
  Paolo Lorenzi
  Stefano Napolitano

The following players received entry from the qualifying draw:
  Riccardo Bonadio
  Tomás Martín Etcheverry
  Omar Giacalone
  Tim van Rijthoven

Champions

Singles

 Thanasi Kokkinakis def.  Enzo Couacaud 6–3, 6–4.

Doubles

  Evan King /  Julian Lenz def.  Karol Drzewiecki /  Sergio Martos Gornés 3–6, 6–3, [11–9].

References

2021 ATP Challenger Tour
Tennis tournaments in Italy
2021 in Italian tennis
May 2021 sports events in Italy